Resurrection is the third album by the rap group Lords of the Underground, released in 1999.

Production
The album was produced by DJ Lord Jazz and K-Def, among others.

Critical reception
The Plain Dealer wrote: "No cornball skits, no cast-of-thousands posse tracks, just two rappers and a disc jockey doing their thing, and doing it well." The Star-Ledger thought that "the Lords are sample-crazy, lifting everything from Bill Withers' 'Ain't No Sunshine' to Sade's 'Jezebel'."

AllMusic wrote that "Resurrection is strongest when it relies on the classic tenets of hip-hop and its MCs' own talent, instead of grafting the latest trend onto an existing formula."

Track listing
"Intro"- 1:47 
"Retaliate"- 3:44 
"If You..."- 4:29 
"Take Dat"- 3:49 
"Path of the Righteous Man"- :28 
"Earth, Wind, & Fire" (feat. Joya)- 4:31 
"Imposter"- 4:14 
"One Day" (feat. Da Brat)- 4:31 
"Hennessey, Pt. 1"- :08 
"Funk for Ya Mama"- 3:08 
"Haters"- 4:25 
"Infinite"- 4:20 
"Blow Your Mind"- :12 
"Nasty Natti"- 4:18 
"Hennessey, Pt. 2"- 4:02 
"Excuse Me"- 5:49 
"Exodus"- 4:05

References

Lords of the Underground albums
1999 albums
Albums produced by K-Def